Trevor D. Traina (born 1968) is an American businessman who served as the United States Ambassador to Austria from 2018 to 2021.

Early life
Traina was born in San Francisco, California in 1968.  He is the son of Diane Buchanan Wilsey and the shipping magnate and art collector John Traina. His younger brother Todd is a film producer. His maternal grandfather, Wiley T. Buchanan Jr. was U.S. Ambassador to Austria from 1975 to 1977.

Trevor Traina graduated from Princeton University with an A.B. in politics in 1990, having written a 112-page long senior thesis titled "The Alaska Native Claims Settlement Act: A Model for the Future?". He later studied at the University of Oxford and at the UC Berkeley Haas School of Business where he graduated as Master of Business Administration.

Career
Traina started his career as brand manager at Seagram's. As an entrepreneur, he was involved in the creation of CompareNet, which was bought by Microsoft in 1999. In total he founded or co-founded five technology startups which were all sold.  The most recent was IfOnly which was sold to MasterCard in August 2020 

Traina was an honorary advisor to the Fine Arts Museum of San Francisco, the Haas School of Business, the Princeton University Art Museum and other institutions. He wrote columns for Huffington Post and for Town and Country magazine.

Ambassador to Austria 

On January 23, 2018, President Donald Trump nominated Traina to become Ambassador Extraordinary and Plenipotentiary of the United States of America to the Republic of Austria.
The post had been vacant since January 2017. The U.S. Senate confirmed Traina's nomination on March 22, 2018. He was unanimously confirmed 

Traina was sworn in on March 29, 2018 and arrived in Vienna on May 18, 2018 to present his credentials. Traina subsequently presented his credentials on May 24, 2018.

Traina risked controversy for supporting the LGBTQ community by flying a rainbow flag at the Embassy during Vienna Pride despite a ban from the State Department on doing so. Traina is credited with arranging the most high level meetings between Austria and the US in history and bringing about an era of Verbundenheit or "new closeness" between the two countries that had not before been seen.

Awards
The Secretary of Defense awarded the Office of the Secretary of Defense Medal for Exceptional Public Service to Traina in January 2021.  The Chancellor of Austria awarded Traina the Austrian Grand Declaration of Honor in Gold in January 2021.  Traina has been awarded over two dozen patents from the USPTO

Publications:  American Photography. 2020 Walter Moser, Anna Heinrich, Trevor Traina

Personal life
Traina is married to Alexis Swanson Traina and has two children. His hobby is collecting photographs, an exhibition of his collection in summer 2012 at the Fine Arts Museum was discussed in the media. Traina made a major loan of photographs to the Albertina museum in Vienna for the Fall 2021 exhibition American Photography. In 2023 Traina paid to restore the Red Rooms in the Schloss Leopoldskron - home of the Salzburg Forum.

References

External links

 Trevor D. Traina biography at U.S. State Department

Living people
People from San Francisco
Princeton University alumni
Alumni of the University of Oxford
Haas School of Business alumni
American philanthropists
1968 births
Ambassadors of the United States to Austria